Swee is a component of Chinese given names and may refer to:

Chen Chong Swee, Singaporean watercolourist
Foo Swee Chin (born 1977), Singaporean comic book artist
Goh Keng Swee (1918–2010), second Deputy Prime Minister of Singapore between 1973 and 1984
Goh Swee Swee (born 1986), Singaporean football striker
Khoo Swee Chiow (born 1964), Singaporean adventurer, author and motivational speaker
Lim Swee Aun, politician from the Malaysian Chinese Association, and a Cabinet member
Lim Swee Say (born 1954), politician from Singapore
Ng Swee Hong (1935–2006), Malaysian Chinese businessman who founded Pacific Andes

See also
Bukit Ho Swee, place in Singapore near Taman Ho Swee
Chin Swee Caves Temple, Taoist temple in Genting Highlands, Pahang, Malaysia
Chin Swee Tunnel, one of the two tunnels of the Central Expressway
Swee'Pea, character in E.C. Segar's comic strip Thimble Theatre/Popeye
Swee waxbill (Estrilda melanotis), a common species of estrildid finch found in Sub-Saharan Africa